York Township is one of the twenty-two townships of Tuscarawas County, Ohio, United States.  The 2000 census found 1,292 people in the township.

Geography
Located at the center of the county, it borders the following townships:
Dover Township - north
Goshen Township - northeast
Warwick Township - southeast
Clay Township - south
Jefferson Township - southwest
Auburn Township - west

No municipalities are located in York Township.

Name and history
It is one of ten York Townships statewide.

York Township was organized in 1828. The township was named after York, Pennsylvania.

Government
The township is governed by a three-member board of trustees, who are elected in November of odd-numbered years to a four-year term beginning on the following January 1. Two are elected in the year after the presidential election and one is elected in the year before it. There is also an elected township fiscal officer, who serves a four-year term beginning on April 1 of the year after the election, which is held in November of the year before the presidential election. Vacancies in the fiscal officership or on the board of trustees are filled by the remaining trustees.  The current trustees are Al Ballentine, David Simmons, and Ron Stein, and the fiscal officer is Carol Beitzel.

References

External links
County website

Townships in Tuscarawas County, Ohio
Townships in Ohio